Claude-Max Lochu (born 1951) is a French artist, painter and designer.

Lochu was born in Delle in Territoire de Belfort, Franche-Comté and completed his degree at the École des Beaux-Arts of Besançon. Lochu was exhibited in the Museum of Fine Arts, Dole, and is now exhibited permanently in Faure Museum as well as in 2 galleries in Paris and Lyon.

Biography 

Claude-Max Lochu completed his National Diploma of Painting at Art School in Besançon (atelier ) in 1975 and first exhibited his works in 1976 in Rabat and Tanger, Morocco. In 1979, he set up in Paris and exhibited his work at the Montrouge Contemporary Art Show in 1981 and 1982. During a first trip to Japan in 1982, he studied the Sumi-é, an ink painting technique, with the Japanese painter . In 1985, he returned to Japan to visit Hiroshige's Tōkaidō road between Kyoto and Tokyo, and was inspired by the concept of fueki ryūkō, permanence and movement, developed by Bashō, the haiku poet. Lochu was exhibited at the Museum of Fine Arts, Dole in 1985.

Claude-Max Lochu also works on still life, interiors, landscapes of south of Europe, such as Mont Ventoux and Sorgue in Luberon, Aix-les-Bains, Valley Di Cecina and Volterra, where he looks for poetry rather than the representation. In addition to his works at the Artima gallery in Paris, Lochu exhibited at Faure Museum of Aix-les-Bains. Since 2001, he has held personal exhibitions at the Accademia libera natura e cultura in Querceto in Italia. Since 2006, he has participated in the Peace and Light Festival for the project of Temple for Peace to be built by the Vajradhara-Ling Center in Normandy with a view to promoting world peace.

In 2000 at Faure Museum, he exhibited Aix les Bains depuis le Boulevard des Anglais, a painting that he performed on his first visit at Aix-les-Bains which is now exposed in the entrance of the museum. It represents an overview of the city and landscape. In 2012, his portrait of Auguste Rodin is added to the collections of the museum.

In 2012, he exhibited at the Faure Museum in Savoie.

In 2013, he exhibited at the Musée des beaux-arts de Gaillac in the Tarn.

From July to September 2013, 26 of his oil paintings, gouaches and drawings are presented at the Musée de l'Aventure Peugeot in Sochaux in the Doubs.

The visitor center of the Pays des Impressionnistes, focused on Impressionists who painted along the Seine River, organized a tour of his atelier in January 2014 in Carrières-sur-Seine.

In March 2016, he exhibited at the Gavart gallery, rue d'Argenson in Paris.

In May and June 2017, an exhibition of his paintings entitled Voyages is held at the Jean Vilar cultural center in  Marly-le-Roi.

From June to August 2018, he is one of the 37 artists to participate in Jubilons → Jubilez – Rétrospective et Perspectives, the last exhibition organized at the Faure museum by its curator, André Liatard.

In 2017, he moved to Arles, where he produced a series of landscapes and exhibits at the Galerie Cezar in 2021.

Publications 
 Catalogue of exhibition of Claude-Max Lochu, 1985, Musée des Beaux-Arts de Dole
 Illustrations of La Princesse qui aimait les chenilles by René de Ceccatty in collaboration with Ryôji Nakamura, 1987, éditions Hatier, 
 Claude Max Lochu : exposition, Aix-les-Bains, Musée Faure, 7 avril-15 mai 2000,  éditeur Aix-les-Bains : Musée Faure, 2000, 
 Claude-Max Lochu: Pour solde de tout compte : expositions, Musée Faure, Aix-les-Bains, 7 avril-17 juin 2012 et Musée des beaux-arts, Gaillac, 1er trimestre 2013, éditeur Musée Faure, 2012, 
 Claude-Max Lochu, Bruno Smolarz, Objets intranquilles & autres merveilles Atéki éditions, 2021,

References

External links

 Official Site of Claude-Max Lochu
 Claude-Max Lochu - du Garage à l'Atelier on Vimeo

1951 births
Living people
People from the Territoire de Belfort
20th-century French painters
20th-century French male artists
French male painters
21st-century French painters
French designers
French contemporary painters
French portrait painters
People from Yvelines